Denmark has two geothermal district heating plants, one in Thisted which started in 1988, and one in Copenhagen which started in 2005. They produce no electricity.

See also 
 Renewable energy in Denmark
 Wind power in Denmark
 Solar Power in Denmark
 Biofuel in Denmark
 Renewable energy by country

References